Trandolapril is an ACE inhibitor used to treat high blood pressure. It may also be used to treat other conditions. It is similar in structure to another ACE Inhibitor, Ramipril but has a cyclohexane group. It also is a pro-drug and must get metabolized. It has a longer half-life when compared to other agents in this class.  

It was patented in 1981, and approved for medical use in 1993. It is marketed by Abbott Laboratories under the brand name Mavik.

Side effects 
Side effects reported for trandolapril include nausea, vomiting, diarrhea, headache, dry cough, dizziness or lightheadedness when sitting up or standing, hypotension, or fatigue.

Possible drug interactions 
Patients also on diuretics may experience an excessive reduction of blood pressure after initiation of therapy with trandolapril. It can reduce potassium loss caused by thiazide diuretics, and increase serum potassium when used alone. Therefore, hyperkalemia is a possible risk. Increased serum lithium levels can occur in patients who are also on lithium.

Contraindications and precautions

Pregnancy and lactation
Trandolapril is teratogenic (US: pregnancy category D) and can cause birth defects and even death of the developing fetus. 	 
The highest risk to the fetus is during the second and third trimesters. When pregnancy is detected, trandolapril should be discontinued as soon as possible. Trandolapril should not be administered to nursing mothers.

Additional effects
Combination therapy with paricalcitol and trandolapril has been found to reduce fibrosis in obstructive uropathy.

Pharmacology 
 
Trandolapril is a prodrug that is de-esterified to trandolaprilat. It is believed to exert its antihypertensive effect through the renin–angiotensin–aldosterone system. Trandolapril has a half-life of about 6 hours, and trandolaprilat has a half life of about 10 h. Trandolaprilat has about eight times the activity of its parent drug. About one-third of trandolapril and its metabolites are excreted in the urine, and about two-thirds of trandolapril and its metabolites are excreted in the feces. Serum protein binding of trandolapril is about 80%.

Mode of action 

Trandolapril acts by competitive inhibition of angiotensin converting enzyme (ACE), a key enzyme in the renin–angiotensin system which plays an important role in regulating blood pressure.

References

External links 
 Trandolapril Information - rxlist.com (Rxlist.com, The Internet Drug Index)

ACE inhibitors
Carboxamides
Carboxylic acids
AbbVie brands
Enantiopure drugs
Ethyl esters
Indoles
Prodrugs